Melipotis famelica is a species of moth in the family Erebidae first described by Achille Guenée in 1852. The species is found from the southern United States (Florida to Texas) to the Caribbean and Paraguay.

The wingspan is about 42 mm.

The larvae feed on Leucaena latisiliqua.

References

Moths described in 1852
Melipotis